Bricia Lopez is a Mexican-American restaurateur and author. Lopez is the co-owner of Guelaguetza, an Oaxacan restaurant in Los Angeles, California in the United States. Lopez is one of America's foremost authorities on Oaxacan culture and cuisine and is credited with helping to popularize mezcal in the United States. She also co-hosts the Super Mamás podcast with her sister, Paulina Lopez.

Early life and education

Bricia Lopez was born in San Pablo Villa de Mitla in Mexico. Her father made mezcal and operated a mezcal store. As a child, Lopez worked in the store, selling mezcal. At the age of ten, she migrated, with her parents, to the United States. Her parents, Maria Monterrubio and Fernando Lopez, opened Guelaguetza, a Oaxacan restaurant in the Koreatown neighborhood of Los Angeles in 1994.

Career

Lopez and her sister, Paulina, and brother, Fernando, took over ownership of Guelaguetza after their parents retired. The late L.A. Times food critic Jonathan Gold called the restaurant "The best Oaxacan restaurant in the United States". In 2015, she co-created the podcast Super Mamás with her sister, Paulina. In 2019, Lopez opened Mama Rabbit at the Park MGM in Las Vegas, Nevada. It claims to have the largest tequila and mezcal selection in the United States, with over 500 offerings. That same year, the cookbook Oaxaca: Home Cooking from the Heart of Mexico, written by Lopez and Javier Cabral, was published. It is the first cookbook published to be written by an Oaxacan person. The book has been named one of the top cookbooks of 2019 by Mother Jones, the Los Angeles Times and The Washington Post.

Personal life

Lopez lives in Montecito Heights, Los Angeles. She is married to Eduardo Maytorena III. They have a son, Eduardo Santiago Maytorena IV. They also have a dog named Diego.

Lopez's favorite meal of the day is breakfast. Two of her favorite Los Angeles restaurants for breakfast include the Olympic Cafe and the Ace Hotel Los Angeles. Ray’s and Stark Bar, at LACMA, is one of her favorite lunch restaurants. Favorite dinner restaurants of Lopez's include Scopa Italian Roots, Republique, Sotto, Bäco Mercat, Sushi Gen, Hama Sushi, and The Stocking Frame. Her favorite Los Angeles coffee shop is Café Demitasse.

Further reading
Lopez, Bricia and Javier Cabral. Oaxaca: Home Cooking from the Heart of Mexico. New York: Harry N. Abrams (2019).

References

External links

Official website for Super Mamás

"Bricia Lopez feels a deep sense of responsibility for her family restaurant, Guelaguetza" from The Splendid Table

Living people
Writers from Los Angeles
21st-century American businesswomen
21st-century American businesspeople
American writers of Mexican descent
Mexican emigrants to the United States
American women restaurateurs
American restaurateurs
21st-century American women writers
Year of birth missing (living people)
Writers from Oaxaca